Winston Creek is a stream in Kenora District, Ontario, Canada. Thus, Winston Creek is in the Hudson Bay drainage basin.

See also
List of rivers of Ontario

References

Rivers of Kenora District